The 2022–23 Purdue Fort Wayne Mastodons men's basketball team represents Purdue University Fort Wayne in the 2022–23 NCAA Division I men's basketball season. The Mastodons, led by ninth-year head coach Jon Coffman, played their home games at the Hilliard Gates Sports Center in Fort Wayne, Indiana, as members of the Horizon League. They finished the season 17–15, 9–11 in Horizon League play to finish in a tie for eighth place. As the No. 9 seed in the Horizon League tournament, they lost to Detroit Mercy in the first round.

Previous season
The Mastodons finished the 2020–21 season 21–12, 15–6 in Horizon League play to finish in a tie for first place, earning a share of the Horizon League regular season championship. As the No. 2 seed in the Horizon League tournament, they defeated UIC in the quarterfinals before losing to Northern Kentucky in the semifinals. The Mastodons accepted an invitation to the College Basketball Invitational and earned the No. 16 overall seed. The Mastodons lost to the No. 1 seed Drake in the first round.

Offseason

Departures

Incoming transfers

Roster

Schedule and results

|-
!colspan=12 style=|Regular season

|-
!colspan=9 style=| Horizon League tournament

|-

Source

References 

Purdue Fort Wayne Mastodons men's basketball seasons
Purdue Fort Wayne Mastodons
Purdue Fort Wayne Mastodons men's basketball
Purdue Fort Wayne Mastodons men's basketball